The Unity Cup was an international football tournament held in May and June 2004 at The Valley Stadium, London. Nigeria, Jamaica and Ireland were the competing sides. Nigeria won the competition with Ireland finishing second. The competitors were countries with large diasporas in London.

Results

Table

References

External links
RSSF

2004
2004 in Republic of Ireland association football
2003–04 in Nigerian football
2004 in Jamaica